Elections for Ipswich Borough Council were held on Thursday 1 May 2008. One third of the seats were up for election. The Labour Party won enough seats to become the largest party gaining 3 seats (2 from Con 1 from Lib Dem). The Conservatives had been the largest party since the 2006 Ipswich Council election.  The results came as a stark contrast which saw the Conservatives make significant gains from Labour across the country.  Particular disappointments for the Conservatives came when they lost Rushmere and Bridge to Labour and narrowly failed to gain St Margaret's from the Liberal Democrats, while narrowly holding onto St John's by a mere 3 votes.  Meanwhile, the Liberal Democrats lost Whitehouse.

After the election, the composition of the council was:

Labour 21
Conservative 19
Liberal Democrat 8
Independent 0

Despite the losses, the Conservative-Liberal Democrat coalition continued to run the Council with a reduced majority of 6 seats.

Election result

Ward results

Alexandra

Bixley

Bridge

Castle Hill

Gainsborough

Gipping

Holywells

Priory Heath

Rushmere

Sprites

St John's

St Margaret's

Stoke Park

Westgate

Whitehouse

Whitton

References 
http://news.bbc.co.uk/2/hi/uk_news/england/suffolk/7373446.stm
2008 English local elections
2008
2000s in Suffolk